Issa Mohammad Nafesh (born 15 August 1995) is a Jordanian footballer, who plays as a goalkeeper for Al-Ahli.

References

External links 
 

Living people
Association football goalkeepers
1995 births
Jordanian footballers
Sportspeople from Amman
Al-Ahli SC (Amman) players